Dog Eat Dog is a Saturday night British game show devised by Howard Davidson, Sarah Edwards, Gail Sloan and Lynn Sutcliffe, that was hosted by Ulrika Jonsson and aired from 14 April 2001 to 2 November 2002 on BBC One.

Format
The programme started off by showing the six contestants at a training day where they underwent various tests to assess their strengths and weaknesses. The contestants talked about themselves and their fellow competitors. In the studio, the contestants voted on who they thought would fail a given challenge, which would either be a mental or physical one. The contestant who received the most votes would have to attempt the challenge. If they failed, they went to the "Loser's Bench", and if they won, they got to choose who went to that area of the studio, before reentering the game. They could only chose someone who voted for them to do the challenge.

In the case of a tied ballot; the person who was sent to the Loser's Bench at the end of the previous challenge gets the tie break vote, and chooses between the tied contestants. If the tied vote happens on the opening round, then a contestant is selected at random; and that person gets to vote between the tied players. A player may not vote for themselves, unless they are the random tie-breaker in a tie and are part of that tie.

The last remaining contestant had the chance of winning the £10,000 prize, but had to face a general knowledge round against the other five competitors. If they could predict which three would get their questions wrong, they won the money; however, if the losers got three of their questions right, they split the prize between them, i.e. £2,000 each, and the overall winner of the show went home with nothing.

Some of the physical challenges carried over to the U.S. version and the format was licensed internationally by BBC Worldwide, the commercial arm of the BBC.

Music
The music for the show was composed by the prolific Paul Farrer, who is mostly famous for composing the music to The Weakest Link.

Transmissions

Other countries

An Australian version hosted by Simone Kessell was briefly aired in 2002 on the Seven Network, but cancelled after receiving dismal ratings. The top prize was $50,000. The show gained more notoriety after it was axed than before it due to a number of tabloid stories regarding contestants who had won money on the show but not received it because the episode they participated in never went to air.

A version made in Dubai by Dubai TV was syndicated across the Arabic-speaking world and each episode featured contestants from different countries in that region.

A German version hosted by Kai Böcking aired on ZDF in 2002. The show's format was generally the same as the other versions, except that the game started with five players instead of six.

The Singapore version of the show was hosted by Guo Liang, under the name Show Me Your Power, was aired in 2003 on Channel U. Dog Eat Dog was considered an inappropriate title.

The U.S. version was hosted by Brooke Burns from 2002 to 2003 on NBC and reruns were picked up by the Game Show Network until 2014.

In Poland, the station TVN broadcast a version of the show in 2002 under the name Oko za oko (literally "eye for eye"). The host was Jarosław Ostaszkiewicz who had previously voiced the Polish version of Big Brother which was also broadcast by TVN.

BBC Worldwide also licensed the format to a broadcaster in Sweden.

References

External links

Dog Eat Dog at BFI

2001 British television series debuts
2002 British television series endings
2000s British game shows
British reality television series
BBC television game shows
English-language television shows
Television series produced at Pinewood Studios